Sercan Yıldırım (born 5 April 1990) is a Turkish former football player who played as a forward.

Club career

Bursaspor
Yıldırım started his career at Bursaspor. He broke into the first team in the 2007–2008 season, making his league debut as a second-half substitute in a 1–0 away defeat at Istanbul B.B in September 2007. He scored his first senior goal for the club three games later in a 2–0 win at Kasımpaşa. His first season saw him only featured eight times for the senior team. The 2008–09 season saw him score four goals in many games getting a brace against both Gençlerbirliği in the second game of the season and also against Kocaelispor two games later. He also got on the scoresheet against Galatasaray in October 2008. In March 2011, he was close to signing a 4-year contract with the Russian side Lokomotiv Moscow, but he failed his physical due to knee problems and Lokomotiv decided not to sign him.

Galatasaray
On 5 September 2011, after days of negotiation, Bursaspor finally agreed on a price with Galatasaray for Sercan. He agreed on a five-year deal (until the 2015–16 season) with Turkish club. In addition to the transfer of Musa Çağıran, the club paid an additional €3 million to Bursaspor. He gave an assist to Johan Elmander with his backheel on 9 September 2011 in a game between Galatasaray and Samsunspor which Galatasaray won 3-1 He scored his first goal for Galatasaray on 7 January 2012 in a game between Galatasaray and Samsunspor which Galatasaray won 4–2. 

On 23 September 2012 Galatasaray's Coach Fatih Terim allow Sercan to play in the first Eleven. Due to the Injuries of both main strikers Umut Bulut and Johan Elmander. He started the new season in the Süper Lig with a Goal in a 3–0 home win against the newcomers Akhisar Belediyespor.

Loan to Şanlıurfaspor
On 30 July 2013, Galatasaray announced that they have reached an agreement with Şanlıurfaspor to loan Sercan to the team for the 2013–14 season, for a fee of €150,000.

Loan to Bursaspor
On 13 August 2015, Yıldırım agreed with Turkish club Bursaspor for one year.

Fatih Karagümrük
Ahead of the 2019/20 season, Yıldırım joined Fatih Karagümrük.

International career
Yıldırım has played at every age group for the Turkish Youth International Team. Whilst playing for the Under-16 level during 2006, he scored 12 goals in 10 games, including a hattrick and three braces. He currently has four caps for the senior squad.
He received his first call up to the Turkish senior squad by Fatih Terim in March 2009, for two 2010 World Cup Qualifying games against Spain, however he was an unused substitute.
He made his debut for Turkey in a friendly against Azerbaijan on 2 June 2009, coming on as a second-half substitute for Tuncay. On 12 August 2009, in a friendly against the Ukraine, he registered 2 assists in Turkey's 3–0 win. He scored his first goal for Turkey on 5 September 2009 in Turkey's World Cup qualification game against Estonia.

Career statistics

Club

International

International goals

Honours

Club
Bursaspor
Süper Lig (1): 2009–10

Galatasaray
Süper Lig (1): 2011–12
Süper Kupa (1): 2012

Individual
 First Turkish footballer in Bursaspor history to score in the Champions League.
 Bursaspor top scorer in the Süper Lig, and in all competitions: 2008–09

References

External links

Player profile at Galatasaray.org

1990 births
Living people
People from Osmangazi
Turkish footballers
Turkey international footballers
Turkey B international footballers
Turkey under-21 international footballers
Turkey youth international footballers
Bursaspor footballers
Galatasaray S.K. footballers
Sivasspor footballers
Şanlıurfaspor footballers
Balıkesirspor footballers
Giresunspor footballers
Fatih Karagümrük S.K. footballers
Süper Lig players
TFF First League players
Association football forwards
Survivor Turkey contestants